
Tangxi may refer to the following places in China:

Anhui
Tangxi, Chizhou (棠溪), a town in Chizhou
Tangxi Subdistrict (塘西街道), a subdistrict in Jinjiazhuang District, Ma'anshan

Guangdong
Tangxi, Fengshun County (汤西), a town in Fengshun County
Tangxi, Raoping County (汤溪), a town in Raoping County

Hunan
Tangxi Township (塘溪乡), a township in Chenzhou
Tangxi, Zixing (汤溪), a town in Zixing

Zhejiang
Tangxi, Hangzhou (塘栖), a town in Hangzhou
Tangxi, Ningbo (塘溪), a town in Ningbo
Tangxi, Jinhua (汤溪), a town in Jinhua